Punjab Town is one of the neighbourhoods of Shah Faisal Town in Karachi, Sindh, Pakistan.

There are several ethnic groups in Punjab Town including Muhajirs, Sindhis, Kashmiris, Seraikis, Pakhtuns, Balochis, Memons, Bohras,  Ismailis, etc. Over 99% of the population is Muslim. The population of Shah Faisal Town is estimated to be nearly one million.

Punjab Town neighbors Rafa-e-Aam Society, Golden Town, Al-Badr Society, Shamsi Society, Jinnah International Airport, Green Town etc. 95% of its population belongs to Punjabi speaking, almost all dialects of Punjab.

There is a small bazaar from where the daily need things are available. There is one Jamia Masjid Named Tayiba Masjid in the center of Punjab Town.

References

External links 
 Karachi Website

Neighbourhoods of Karachi